Miguel de Vasconcelos (or Vasconcellos) e Brito (– 1 December 1640) was the last Secretary of State (Prime Minister) of the Kingdom of Portugal, during the Philippine Dynasty, in which both kingdoms of Portugal and Spain remained separated but united by the same king and foreign policy. 

He was in office from 1635 to 1640, serving under Margaret of Savoy, Vicereine of Portugal, the Duchess of Mantua, a cousin of King Philip III. 

He was probably the most hated collaborator with the Spanish, considered a traitor during the last years of the Philippine Dynasty, especially after the revolts of 1637. On the morning of 1 December 1640, a group of Portuguese noblemen who wanted to restore full independence started a revolution, immediately supported by the people of Lisbon. After entering the palace, the conspirators sought Miguel Vasconcelos, but saw no sign of him. They would eventually find Miguel de Vasconcelos hidden in a closet with a gun. His movements within the small closet and the rustling of papers inside gave away his position. He was shot to death and defenestrated, leaving his corpse to the angry public.

See also
History of Portugal (1578-1777)

1640 deaths
Prime Ministers of Portugal
1590s births
16th-century Portuguese people
17th-century Portuguese people
People executed by defenestration